Bishop Sarabamon or Serapamon was the Bishop and Abbot of the Monastery of Saint Pishoy in Wadi El Natrun, Beheira Governorate, Egypt, from 1977 until his death on 8 March 2020.

Early life 
He was born Azer Qalid Bastarous in Armant, Luxor, Kingdom of Egypt, on February 20, 1937. He joined the Monastery of the Virgin Mary of the Syrians, and was tonsured as a monk on Tuesday, December 8, 1959. He chose the name Sarabamon (arabized version of Serapamon) as the date of his consecration corresponded to the 28th of Hathor, which was the feast day of the Martyrdom of Saint Serapamon the Bishop of Nikiou.

On Sunday, February 24, 1963, he was ordained a Presbyter. He was later elevated to the dignity of Hegumen on Sunday, June 25, 1967, and was designated as the monastery's confessor.

Episcopate 
On Sunday, June 17, 1973, corresponding to the Feast of Pentecost, he was consecrated a General Bishop by the hands of Pope Shenouda III. Later, on Sunday, May 29, 1977, he was enthroned as Bishop and Abbot of the Monastery of Saint Pishoy.

On Wednesday, January 31, 1996, he was granted the Great Schema, in recognition of his completion of over 30 years of monastic piety, and service. The Monastery also held a celebration commemorating his 60th year of monasticism on December 2, 2019.

During his episcopate, he was a member of the Holy Synod's Monasteries and Monastic Affairs Committee, Rites Committee, and Diocesan Affairs Committee. He was also responsible for overseeing the construction of new monasteries in Europe and North America.

Death 
On Sunday, March 8, 2020, Bishop Sarabamon died after a four-day hospitalization. Funerary rites were prayed on Tuesday, March 10, 2020, and he was laid to rest in a tomb adjacent to the Pope Shenouda III Memorial in the Monastery of Saint Pishoy.

See also 

 Metropolitan Serapion

References 

1937 births
2020 deaths
Coptic Orthodox bishops
People from Luxor Governorate